Prissé-la-Charrière is a former commune in the Deux-Sèvres department in western France. On 1 January 2018, it was merged into the new commune of Plaine-d'Argenson.

Geography 
Is located in Deux-Sèvres in the Nouvelle-Aquitaine region of France. The closest airport to Prissé-la-Charrière is La Rochelle Airport (56 km).

See also
Communes of the Deux-Sèvres department

References

Former communes of Deux-Sèvres
Populated places disestablished in 2018